The Stein Glacier is a 4 km long glacier (2005) situated in the Urner Alps in the canton of Berne in Switzerland. In 1973 it had an area of 6.06 km2.

See also
List of glaciers in Switzerland
Swiss Alps

External links

Swiss glacier monitoring network
Glaciers online

Glaciers of the Alps
Glaciers of the canton of Bern
GStein